The Autovía LO-20 is an autovía in Logroño, La Rioja, Spain. Intended as a ring road, it currently runs from east to west along the south of the city, as an upgrade of the N-232 road, for a distance of 14 km (8.5 miles).

Autopistas and autovías in Spain
Transport in La Rioja (Spain)